The Gifted Ones is a 1977 studio album by Count Basie and Dizzy Gillespie.

Reception

In a review for AllMusic, Scott Yanow wrote: " The music is generally quite rewarding... but never reaches the great heights one might have expected."

Track listing 
"Back to the Land" (Count Basie, Dizzy Gillespie) – 7:20
"Constantinople" (Gillespie) – 8:28
"You Got It" (Frank Foster) – 5:21
"St. James Infirmary Blues" (Irving Mills, Traditional) – 6:54
"Follow the Leader" (Basie, Gillespie) – 6:24
"Ow!" (Gillespie) – 6:14

Personnel 
 Count Basie - piano
 Dizzy Gillespie - trumpet
 Joe Pass - guitar
 Ray Brown - double bass
 Mickey Roker - drums

References 

1977 albums
Count Basie albums
Dizzy Gillespie albums
Pablo Records albums
Albums produced by Norman Granz